"Spring Will Be a Little Late This Year" is the title of a 1943 traditional pop composition by Frank Loesser, written for and introduced in the 1944 movie Christmas Holiday, the song was largely overlooked for some ten years before being rediscovered in the mid-1950s to become a pop and jazz standard much recorded by vocalists and instrumentalists.

Composition / theme
An early instance of Frank Loesser writing his own music for his lyrics, "Spring Will Be a Little Late This Year" has been described by singer Michael Feinstein  - the "foremost expert on the music of the Great American Songbook" - as "a perfect example of that heart-on-your-sleeve quality evident in so many [Loesser songs]." The composer's daughter: Susan Loesser, classes the song as a rare "melancholy" item in her father's songbook, but one whose lyric is "not without hope". "Spring Will Be ..." belongs to a sub-genre of songs which treat springtime as a metaphor in an ironic context, the most extreme exemplars such as "Spring Is Here" and "Spring Can Really Hang You Up the Most" "upend[ing] the conventional view of spring as the season of rebirth [to instead] use spring as the setting for expressions of disenchantment or remorse": however "Loesser's lyric ... follow[s] a middle course, evoking a state of mind neither breezily cheerful nor trite; but not unremittingly dark either."

First recordings and Christmas Holiday
"Spring Will Be a Little Late This Year" was written for the film Christmas Holiday to be sung by the female lead Deanna Durbin, a movie musical star from the age of 14 who at age 23 was making a career shift with an essentially dramatic role as a fallen woman working a taxi dance hall near New Orleans. The film discreetly posits Durbin's character as a singer who is first seen singing "Spring Will Be ..." at the dance hall in a performance which eschews Durbin's established "perky upbeat operetta persona" in favor of a "downbeat bluesy jazz" style. The lyrics of "Spring Will Be ..." touch on the film's plot: Dean Harens plays a serviceman who, just after receiving a Dear John letter, is flying home for Christmas when a storm mandates a layover in New Orleans. Meeting Durbin at the dance hall, Harens treats her chivalrously, and she eventually confides her sad history. Once married to a charming roué (Gene Kelly) who has been jailed for murder, Durbin is now self-indentured at the dance hall as penance for failing to somehow save her husband from himself. Subsequent to a denouement which frees Durbin from her thralldom, with imminent romance with Harens implied, Christmas Holiday ends with Durbin gazing up at an overcast sky whose clouds drift apart as she watches.

Completed in February 1944, Christmas Holiday would be released June 1944 to become a box office hit while making only a transient impression on the public consciousness, suggesting that moviegoers anticipating the lighter fare associated with Deanna Durbin and Gene Kelly were disappointed by Christmas Holiday and preferred to forget the film, whose few critical notices virtually ignored "Spring Will Be a Little Late This Year" (Margaret Bean of the Spokesman-Review dismissed the film's "new song" as "not too appealing"). The song had already had three recorded versions prior to the film's release, beginning with that by Johnnie Johnston with the Paul Weston Orchestra, released March 1944 (the song serving as B-side to a 78-rpm single entitled "Irresistible You"), followed by recordings by Percy Faith (recorded April 24, 1944), as an instrumental) and Morton Downey (recorded May 8, 1944, for June 8, release). Also recorded in 1944 by Eddy Howard, "Spring Will Be ..." was recorded by Deanna Durbin - in her signature soprano - in a December 1944 session in which Durbin also recorded the other song she'd sung in Christmas Holiday: "Always", with the tracks being paired on a March 1945 single release (on which "Always" was designated as A-side). Durbin's studio recording of "Spring Will Be ..." is the first evident instance of the song's two verses being preceded by a four line song intro which has rarely been included in subsequent recordings of the song. (See sidebox below.)

Rediscovery
As with its parent film, "Spring Will Be a Little Late This Year" seemed to soon lose such attention as it had garnered, the first evident recording of the song subsequent to 1944 being a 1950 release by the Ralph Flanagan Orchestra with vocalist Harry Prime. The song seems to have come to the fore due to its being recorded in the mid-1950s by Sarah Vaughan, who was evidently the first female vocalist to record "Spring Will Be ..." since Deanna Durbin in 1944, Vaughan also evidently being the song's first jazz-influenced interpreter. Vaughan first recorded "Spring Will Be ..." in a January 5, 1953, session with the Percy Faith Orchestra - Faith having made one of the earliest recordings of the song; the track being released as a single March 3, 1953, and appeared on the 1955 album Sarah Vaughan in Hi-Fi. Subsequent to Vaugahn's version, "Spring Will Be ..." has been recorded on a constant basis mostly by jazz-influenced and/or traditional pop vocalists, mostly female. ("Nearly all the best songs about spring are about disappointment, and all the best versions are by tuned-in women who know the score.")

Recorded versions
Vocal versions of "Spring Will Be a Little Late This Year" include those recorded by (album titles in italics):

Johnnie Johnston with the Paul Weston Orchestra: 78-rpm single 1944
Morton Downey: 78-rpm single 1944
Eddy Howard: 78-rpm single 1944
Deanna Durbin: 78-rpm single 1945
Harry Prime with the Ralph Flanagan Orchestra: 78-rpm single 1950
Sarah Vaughan with the Percy Faith Orchestra 78-rpm single 1953
Steve Allen Steve Sings 1956
Ray Charles Singers Spring is Here 1956
Helen Merrill Helen Merrill With Strings 1956
Rita Reys with the Jazz Messengers The Cool Voice of Rita Reys 1956
Four Lads The Four Lads Sing Frank Loesser 1957
Joni James Joni Sings Songs by Frank Loesser 1956
Dick Haymes Little White Lies 1958
Jeri Southern Coffee, Cigarettes & Memories 1958
Eydie Gormé Love is a Season 1959
Polly Bergen Four Seasons of Love 1960
Ella Fitzgerald Hello Love 1960
Randy Van Horne Singers Sleighride 1960
Lorez Alexandria Deep Roots 1962
Vic Damone Young & Lively 1962
Anita O'Day with Cal Tjader Time for 2 1962
Joanie Sommers Sommers' Seasons 1963
Leslie Uggams So in Love! 1963
Larry Hovis Hogan's Heroes Sing the Best of World War II (multi-artist album) 1966

Julie London Easy Does It 1968
Lee Wiley Back Home Again: All New Performances 1971
Reg Varney Reg's Party 1973
Margaret Whiting & Johnny Desmond Ben Bagley's Frank Loesser Revisited (multi-artist album) 1974
Patty Weaver Patty Weaver Sings "As Time Goes By" 1976
Bing Crosby with the Pete Moore Orchestra Seasons 1977
Anita Ellis with Ellis Larkins A Legend Sings 1979
Audrey Morris Film Noir 1989

Jo Sullivan Loesser Loesser by Loesser - Salute to Frank Loesser by Jo Sullivan Loesser (1992) 
Abbey Lincoln Devil's Got Your Tongue 1992
Sathima Bea Benjamin A Morning In Paris 1997 (album recorded February 24, 1963)
Carly Simon Film Noir 1997
Lina Nyberg Smile 2000
Kitty Margolis Left Coast Life 2001
Barbara Lea The Melody Lingers On 2002
Michael Feinstein with the Israel Philharmonic Orchestra self-titled album 2003
Andrea Marcovicci in medley with "I Wish I Didn't Love You So" If I Were Bell: The Songs of Frank Loesser 2004
Carol Sloane We'll Meet Again 2009
Liz Callaway Anywhere I Wander: Liz Callaway Sings Frank Loesser 2013 
Seth Macfarlane No One Ever Tells You 2015
Diana Panton blue 2022

The song has also been established as a favored piece by pop and jazz instrumentalists, exemplified by recorded versions by (album titles in italics):

Percy Faith Orchestra: 78-rpm single 1944
Frankie Carle & his Orchestra Frankie Carle Plays Frank Loesser 1950
Ralph Sharon Spring Fever 1953
Mundell Lowe The Mundell Lowe Quintet 1954
Percy Faith Orchestra North & South of the Border 1955
Dick Marx & John Frigo (medley: "Spring Is Here/ Spring Will Be a Little Late This Year") Too Much Piano 1955
Dennis Farnon & his Orchestra Caution! Men Swinging 1957
Camarata Spring 1958
Ahmad Jamal Trio Count 'Em 88 1956
Sal Salvador Quartet Colors in Sound 1958
Red Garland All Kinds of Weather 1959
Richard Maltby & his Orchestra Swingin' Down the Lane 1959
Roland Kirk Domino 1962
Ramsey Lewis Trio Sound of Spring 1962
Buddy DeFranco & Tommy Gumina Pol.Y Tones 1963
Tommy Gwaltney with Steve Jordan & John Eaton Great Jazz 1963
Archie Semple The Twilight Cometh 1963
Ronnie Aldrich The Romantic Pianos of Ronnie Aldrich 1964

Ferrante & Teicher Ferrante & Teicher 1971
Pim Jacobs Trio Come Fly With Me 1982
Yehudi Menuhin & Stéphane Grappelli For All Seasons 1985
Loren Schoenberg & his Jazz Orchestra Time Waits For No One 1987
Harry Allen Quartet Blue Skies - Jazz Ballads From the 1930s to Today 1994
Larry Porter Trio March Blues 1995
Benny Carter & Phil Woods Another Time, Another Place 1996
Peter Mintun Piano at the Paramount 1997
Bob Alberti Trio Nice & Easy 1998
Chris Anderson From the Heart 1998
Larry Coryell Private Concert 1998
Wynton Marsalis Standard Time, Vol. 5: The Midnight Blues 1998
Joe Locke & David Hazeltine QuartetMutual Admiration Society 1999
David Murray Quartet Seasons 1999
Ralph Sharon Quartet Ralph Sharon Quartet Plays the Frank Loesser Songbook 1999
John Bunch Trio World War II Love Songs 2001
Ken Peplowski Quartet When You Wish Upon a Star 2007
Curtis Fuller The Story of Cathy & Me 2011

References

1943 songs
Songs written for films
Songs written by Frank Loesser
Bing Crosby songs
Vic Damone songs
Ella Fitzgerald songs
Eydie Gormé songs
Carly Simon songs
Sarah Vaughan songs